Centrosomal protein of 290 kDa is a protein that in humans is encoded by the CEP290 gene. CEP290 is located on the Q arm of chromosome 12.

Function 

The gene CEP290 is a centrosomal protein that plays an important role in centrosome and cilia development.  This gene is vital in the formation of the primary cilium, a small antenna-like projections of the cell membrane that plays an important role in the photoreceptors at the back of the retina (which detect light and color) and in the kidney, brain, and many other organs of the body. Knocking down levels of the CEP290 gene transcript resulted in dramatic suppression of ciliogenesis in retinal pigment epithelial cells in culture, proving just how important CEP290 is to cilia formation.

On a molecular level, CEP290 has been shown to play a critical regulatory and structural role in primary cilium formation. Recent studies have implicated CEP290 as a microtubule and membrane binding protein that might serve as a structural link between the microtubule core of the cilium and the overlying ciliary membrane. Disruption of CEP290's microtubule binding domain in the rd16 mouse model of CEP290 disease  has been shown to result in rapid and dramatic retinal degeneration, demonstrating the importance of CEP290 microtubule binding in disease. The role of CEP290 in promoting ciliogenesis is inhibited both by auto-regulatory domains found at either end of the CEP290 protein  and through CEP290's interaction with the inhibitory protein CP110.

The discovery of the CEP290 gene has led researchers to find another gene critical in retinal function, LCA5. Clinical trials involving gene replacement of these two genes have started in Philadelphia, where researchers are hopeful that Leber Congenital Amaurosis will one day be cured.

Structure 

This gene encodes a protein with 13 putative coiled-coil domains, a region with homology to SMC chromosome segregation ATPases, six KID motifs, three tropomyosin homology domains and an ATP/GTP binding site motif A. The protein is localized to the centrosome and cilia and has sites for N-glycosylation, tyrosine sulfation, phosphorylation, N-myristoylation, and amidation.

Clinical significance 

Mutations in this gene have been associated with Joubert syndrome and nephronophthisis, and recently with a frequent form of Leber's congenital amaurosis, called LCA10.  The presence of antibodies against this protein is associated with several forms of cancer.

A mutation in this gene leads to infant and child blindness, a disease known as Leber Congenital Amaurosis. As of today, 35 different mutations in CEP290 are responsible for causing LCA. Other mutations in CEP290 have also been identified in causing Meckel Syndrome and Joubert Syndrome, a few among many syndromes. A defective CEP290 gene is usually the cause of these disorders due to abnormal cilia.  It is unknown how one mutation in a gene can cause so many different types of syndromes, particularly many of which affect the Central Nervous System.

References

External links
  GeneReviews/NIH/NCBI/UW entry on Bardet-Biedl Syndrome

Further reading

Centrosome